Elizabeth "Liz" Heller is an American producer and entrepreneur. Described by USA Today as the "'godmother' of the women's cyber movement in Hollywood," Heller is noted for her early advocacy of the internet in the entertainment industry.

Early life and education 

Heller was born in Los Angeles and raised in Beverly Hills, California, the daughter of Seymour Heller, a personal manager, and Billie Heller, a women's rights activist.   She attended the University of California, Los Angeles.

Career 

Heller began her career as an assistant at Epic Records. In 1983, she was hired by MCA Records; as an artist development executive, Heller commissioned more than 500 music videos for artists including Bobby Brown, Belinda Carlisle, and Tom Petty. She remained at MCA until 1990, when she was appointed president of Island Visual Arts.   In 1994, Heller began working at Capitol Records, where she served as vice president of new media, and gained attention for developing early strategic alliances between the label and  Microsoft, Macromedia, Liquid Audio and Apple, among other technology companies. Additionally, Heller acted as an executive producer on several of the label's soundtrack releases.   She was named executive vice president of Capitol in 1996.

While at Capitol, Heller was reunited with music video director Scott Kalvert, who she had worked with at Island Visual Arts. Kalvert, who grew up in New York, had spent more than a decade unsuccessfully "making the studio rounds," trying to get Jim Carroll's autobiography, The Basketball Diaries, made into a film.  Excited by the idea, Heller took the project to her former boss, Chris Blackwell, who agreed to invest in the film.  Heller produced The Basketball Diaries, which starred Leonardo DiCaprio, released by Palm Pictures in 1995.

Heller founded Buzztone, a marketing company, in 2000. Focused on brand building, cause marketing, social media, and ecommerce strategies, Buzztone's clients have included Microsoft, Paramount Pictures, Electronic Arts, Product(RED), Sony Pictures, and Coca-Cola. She has been a strategic partnership and initiative adviser for TOMS since 2008.

From 2000 through 2002, Heller served as the managing director of Prime Ventures, an investment firm founded by Richard Rosenblatt.  In 2010, she founded Vwalls, a social publishing platform, with her husband, John Bard Manulis.

Heller is on the board of directors for uWink and the advisory board for Boopsie.  She is a frequent speaker at conferences, events, and seminars worldwide.

Heller is a mentor for X Media Lab, a digital media think tank,  and hosts regular networking events for women in Los Angeles.  She is a member of the Los Angeles Sustainable Business Council, and is active in the Liberty Hill Foundation.  Heller and Manulis were presented with the Liberty Hill Founder's Award in 2010.

Personal 

Heller lives with her husband John Bard Manulis in Los Angeles.

Honors and distinctions 

Founders Award, Liberty Hill Foundation, 2010
Best in the Business, NARIP, 2009 
Rising Star, National Association of Women Business Owners, 2004
Executive director, Grammy Awards host committee, 1993
Cable Ace Award nomination, New Orleans Live, 1992

Filmography/Discography

References 

Year of birth missing (living people)
Living people
People from Los Angeles
Film producers from California
American music industry executives
American women film producers
21st-century American women